Stéphane Udry (born 1961 in Sion, Switzerland) is an astronomer at the Geneva Observatory in Switzerland, whose current work is primarily the search for extra-solar planets. He and his team, in 2007, discovered a possibly terrestrial planet in the habitable zone of the Gliese 581 planetary system, approximately 20 light years away in the constellation Libra. He also led the observational team that discovered HD 85512 b, another most promisingly habitable exoplanet.

Career 
Udry earned a doctorate at the University of Geneva in 1992, and spent two years at Rutgers University in New Jersey. Later, Udry returned to Geneva, and worked with Michel Mayor, the discoverer of 51 Pegasi b, the first extrasolar planet found revolving around a normal star. In 2007, Udry was appointed full professor in the faculty of natural sciences at the University of Geneva.

Research 

Udry's initial research concerned the dynamics of galaxies. His current work chiefly concerns the search for extra-solar planets by analyzing variations in the radial velocities of stars. Among them was Gliese 581c (announced April 25, 2007) which at the time, was the most likely candidate for habitability of any extrasolar planet discovered so far. The planet was discovered by analyzing data obtained by the High Accuracy Radial Velocity Planet Searcher (HARPS) on the European Southern Observatory's 3.6 meter telescope at La Silla Observatory in Chile.

He was interviewed by Mat Kaplan on Planetary Radio. Udry described a new instrument known as the Echelle Spectrography for Rocky Exoplanet and Stable Spectroscopic Observations, dubbed ESPRESSO, might allow astronomers to detect Earth-like planets within five to ten years from 2010.

An upgraded HARPS, of which Udry lead the observational team, found evidence that Gliese 581d might be more habitable (rather than c or g), and also detected another promising candidate: HD 85512 b.

See also 
 Euler Telescope
 Next-Generation Transit Survey

References

20th-century Swiss astronomers
University of Geneva alumni
Rutgers University faculty
Academic staff of the University of Geneva
Living people
1961 births
Discoverers of exoplanets
People from Sion, Switzerland
21st-century Swiss astronomers